Events from the year 1670 in Sweden

Incumbents
 Monarch – Charles XI

Events

Births

 19 June - Olof Celsius, botanist, philologist  (died 1756) 
 12 April - Gustav, Duke of Zweibrücken, prince  (died 1731)

Deaths

References

External links

 
Years of the 17th century in Sweden
Sweden